Billy Higgins (October 11, 1936 – May 3, 2001) was an American jazz drummer. He played mainly free jazz and hard bop.

Biography
Higgins was born in Los Angeles, California, United States.  Higgins played on Ornette Coleman's first records, beginning in 1958. He then freelanced extensively with hard bop and other post-bop players, including Donald Byrd, Dexter Gordon, Grant Green, Herbie Hancock, Joe Henderson, Don Cherry, Paul Horn, Milt Jackson, Jackie McLean, Pat Metheny, Hank Mobley, Thelonious Monk, Lee Morgan, David Murray, Art Pepper, Sonny Rollins, Mal Waldron, and Cedar Walton.  He was one of the house drummers for Blue Note Records and played on dozens of Blue Note albums of the 1960s. He also collaborated with composer La Monte Young and guitarist Sandy Bull.

In his career, he played on over 700 recordings, including recordings of rock and funk. He appeared as a jazz drummer in the 2001 movie, Southlander.

In 1989, Higgins cofounded a cultural center, The World Stage, in Los Angeles to encourage and promote younger jazz musicians. The center provides workshops in performance and writing, as well as concerts and recordings.  Higgins also taught in the jazz studies program at the University of California, Los Angeles.

He was divorced from wife Mauricina Altier Higgins and had three sons, William, Joseph, and David, as well as a stepson Jody. He also had two daughters, Rickie Wade and Heidi.

Billy Higgins died of kidney and liver failure on May 3, 2001 at a hospital in Inglewood, California.

Discography

As leader 
 1979: Soweto (Red)
 1979: The Soldier (Timeless, [1981])
 1980: Once More (Red)
 1984: Mr. Billy Higgins (Evidence)
 1980-86: Bridgework (Contemporary)
 1994: ¾ for Peace (Red)
 1997: Billy Higgins Quintet (Evidence)
 2001: The Best of Summer Nights at Moca (Exodus)

As a sideman
With Gene Ammons and Sonny Stitt
 God Bless Jug and Sonny (Prestige, 1973 [2001])
 Left Bank Encores (Prestige, 1973 [2001])
With Chris Anderson
Blues One (DIW, 1991)
With Gary Bartz
 Libra (Milestone, 1968)
With Paul Bley
 Live at the Hilcrest Club 1958 (Inner City, 1958 [1976])
 Coleman Classics Volume 1 (Improvising Artists, 1958 [1977])
With Sandy Bull
 Fantasias for Guitar and Banjo (Vanguard, 1963)
 Inventions (Vanguard, 1965)
With Jaki Byard
 On the Spot! (Prestige, 1967)
With Donald Byrd
 Royal Flush (Blue Note, 1961)
 Free Form (Blue Note, 1962)
 Blackjack (Blue Note, 1967)
 Slow Drag (Blue Note, 1967)
With Joe Castro
 Groove Funk Soul (Atlantic, 1959)
With Don Cherry
 Brown Rice (EMI, 1975)
 Art Deco (A&M, 1988)
With Sonny Clark
 Leapin' and Lopin' (Blue Note, 1961)
With George Coleman
 Amsterdam After Dark (Timeless, 1979)
With Ornette Coleman
 Something Else!!!! (Contemporary, 1958)
 The Shape of Jazz to Come (Atlantic, 1959)
 Change of the Century (Atlantic, 1959)
 The Art of the Improvisers (Atlantic, 1959)
 To Whom Who Keeps a Record (Warner, 1959–60)
 Free Jazz: A Collective Improvisation (Atlantic, 1961)
 Twins (Atlantic, 1961)
 Science Fiction (Columbia, 1971)
 In All Languages (Caravan of Dreams, 1987)
With John Coltrane
 Like Sonny (Roulette, 1960)
With Junior Cook
Somethin's Cookin' (Muse, 1981)
With Bill Cosby
 Hello, Friend: To Ennis With Love (Verve, 1997)
With Stanley Cowell
 Regeneration (Strata East, 1976)
With Ray Drummond
 The Essence (DMP, 1985)
With Teddy Edwards
Teddy Edwards at Falcon's Lair (MetroJazz, 1958)
Sunset Eyes (Pacific Jazz, 1960)
 Teddy's Ready! (Contemporary, 1960)
 Nothin' But the Truth! (Prestige, 1966)
Young at Heart (Storyville, 1979) with Howard McGhee
Wise in Time (Storyville, 1979) with Howard McGhee
Mississippi Lad (Verve/Gitanes, 1991)
Tango in Harlem (Verve/Gitanes, 1994)
With Booker Ervin
 Tex Book Tenor (Blue Note, 1968)
With Art Farmer
 Homecoming (Mainstream, 1971)
 Yesterday's Thoughts (East Wind, 1975)
 To Duke with Love (East Wind, 1975)
 The Summer Knows (East Wind, 1976)
 Art Farmer Quintet at Boomers (East Wind, 1976)
With Curtis Fuller
 Smokin' (Mainstream, 1972)
With Stan Getz
 Cal Tjader-Stan Getz Sextet (1958, Fantasy) with Cal Tjader
With Dexter Gordon
 Go (Blue Note, 1962)
 A Swingin' Affair (Blue Note, 1962)
 Clubhouse (Blue Note, 1965 – released 1979)
 Gettin' Around (Blue Note, 1965)
 Tangerine (Prestige, 1972 [1975])
 Generation (Prestige, 1972)
 Something Different (SteepleChase, 1975 [1980])
 Bouncin' with Dex (SteepleChase, 1976)
 The Other Side of Round Midnight (Blue Note, 1985)
With Grant Green
 First Session (Blue Note, 1961)
 Goin' West (Blue Note, 1962)
 Feelin' the Spirit (Blue Note, 1962)
With Dodo Greene
My Hour of Need (Blue Note, 1962)
With Charlie Haden
 Quartet West (Verve, 1986)
 Silence (Soul Note, 1987)
 The Private Collection (Naim, 1987-88 [2000])
 First Song (Soul Note, 1990 [1992])
With Slide Hampton
Roots (Criss Cross, 1985)
With Herbie Hancock
 Takin' Off (Blue Note, 1962)
 Round Midnight (soundtrack) (Columbia, 1985)
With Barry Harris
 Bull's Eye! (Prestige, 1968)
With Eddie Harris
 The In Sound (Atlantic, 1965)
 Mean Greens (Atlantic, 1966)
 The Tender Storm (Atlantic, 1966)
 Excursions (Atlantic, 1966–73)
 How Can You Live Like That? (Atlantic, 1976)
With Johnny Hartman
 Today (Perception, 1972)
With Jimmy Heath
 Love and Understanding (Muse, 1973)
 The Time and the Place (Landmark, 1974 [1994])
 Picture of Heath (Xanadu, 1975)
With Joe Henderson
 Mirror Mirror (MPS, 1980)
With Andrew Hill
 Dance with Death (Blue Note, 1968 – not released until 1980)
With Richard "Groove" Holmes
 Get Up & Get It! (Prestige, 1967)
With Paul Horn
 Something Blue (HiFi Jazz, 1960)
With Toninho Horta
 Once I Loved (Verve, 1992)
With Freddie Hubbard
 Bolivia (Music Master, 1991)
With Bobby Hutcherson
 Stick-Up (Blue Note, 1969)
 Solo / Quartet (Contemporary, 1982)
 Farewell Keystone (Theresa, 1982 [1988])
 Color Schemes (Landmark, 1985 [1986])
With J. J. Johnson
Pinnacles (Milestone, 1980)
With Hank Jones and Dave Holland
 The Oracle (EmArcy, 1990)
With Sam Jones
 Seven Minds (East Wind Records, 1974)
 Cello Again (Xanadu, 1976)
 Something in Common (Muse, 1977)
With Clifford Jordan
 Soul Fountain (Vortex, 1966 [1970])
 Glass Bead Games (Strata-East, 1974)
 Night of the Mark VII (Muse, 1975)
 On Stage Vol. 1 (SteepleChase, 1975 [1977])
 On Stage Vol. 2 (SteepleChase, 1975 [1978])
 On Stage Vol. 3 (SteepleChase, 1975 [1979])
 Firm Roots (Steeplechase, 1975)
 The Highest Mountain (Steeplechase, 1975)
With Fred Katz
 Fred Katz and his Jammers (Decca, 1959)
With Steve Lacy
 Evidence (New Jazz, 1962) with Don Cherry
With Charles Lloyd
 Acoustic Masters I (Atlantic, 1993)
 Voice in the Night (ECM, 1999)
 The Water Is Wide (ECM, 2000)
 Hyperion with Higgins (ECM, 2001, released posthumously)
 Which Way Is East (ECM, 2004, released posthumously)
With Pat Martino
 The Visit! (Cobblestone, 1972) also released as Footprints
With Jackie McLean
 A Fickle Sonance (Blue Note, 1961)
 Let Freedom Ring Blue Note, 1962)
 Vertigo (Blue Note, 1962–63)
 Action Action Action (Blue Note, 1964)
 Consequence (Blue Note, 1965 [2005])
 New and Old Gospel (Blue Note, 1967)
With Charles McPherson
 The Quintet/Live! (Prestige, 1966)
 Horizons (Prestige, 1968)
 Today's Man (Mainstream, 1973)
With Pat Metheny
 Rejoicing (ECM, 1983)
With Blue Mitchell
 Bring It Home to Me (Blue Note, 1966)
With Red Mitchell
 Presenting Red Mitchell (Contemporary, 1957)
With Hank Mobley
 The Turnaround (Blue Note, 1965)
 Dippin' (Blue Note, 1965)
 A Caddy for Daddy (Blue Note, 1965)
 A Slice of the Top (Blue Note, 1966 [1979])
 Hi Voltage (Blue Note, 1967)
 Third Season (Blue Note, 1967)
 Far Away Lands (Blue Note, 1967)
 Reach Out! (Blue Note, 1968)
 Breakthrough! (Muse, 1972) with Cedar Walton
 Straight No Filter (Blue Note, 1964-66 [1980])
With Thelonious Monk
 Thelonious Monk at the Blackhawk (Riverside, 1960)
With Buddy Montgomery
Ties of Love (Landmark, 1987)
With Tete Montoliu
Secret Love (Timeless, 1977)
Live at the Keystone Corner (Timeless, 1979 [1981])
With Frank Morgan
Easy Living (Contemporary, 1985)
Lament (Contemporary, 1986)
Bebop Lives! (Contemporary, 1987)
Love, Lost & Found (Telarc, 1995)
With Lee Morgan
 The Sidewinder (Blue Note, 1963)
 Search for the New Land (Blue Note, 1964)
 The Rumproller (Blue Note, 1965)
 The Gigolo (Blue Note, 1965)
 Cornbread (Blue Note, 1965)
 Infinity (Blue Note, 1965 [1980])
 Delightfulee (Blue Note, 1966)
 Charisma (Blue Note, 1966)
 The Rajah (Blue Note, 1966 [1984])
 Sonic Boom (Blue Note, 1967 [1979])
 The Sixth Sense (Blue Note, 1967–68)
 The Procrastinator (Blue Note, 1967 [1978])
 Taru (Blue Note, 1968 [1980])
 Caramba! (Blue Note, 1968)
With Bheki Mseleku
 Star Seeding (Polygram Records, 1995)
With David Murray
 Live at Sweet Basil Volume 1 (Black Saint, 1984)
 Live at Sweet Basil Volume 2 (Black Saint, 1984)
With Horace Parlan
 Happy Frame of Mind (Blue Note, 1963)
With Niels-Henning Ørsted Pedersen
 Jaywalkin' (SteepleChase, 1975)
 Double Bass (SteepleChase, 1976) with Sam Jones
With Art Pepper
So in Love (Artists House, 1979)
Artworks (Galaxy, 1979 [1984])
 Landscape (Galaxy, 1979)
Besame Mucho (JVC, 1979 [1981])
 Straight Life (Galaxy, 1979)
 Art 'n' Zoot (Pablo, 1981 [1995]) with Zoot Sims 
With Dave Pike
 It's Time for Dave Pike (Riverside, 1961)
Pike's Groove (Criss Cross Jazz, 1986) with Cedar Walton
With Jimmy Raney
 The Influence (Xanadu, 1975)
With Sonny Red
 Sonny Red (Mainstream, 1971)
With Freddie Redd
Live at the Studio Grill (Triloka, 1990)
With Joshua Redman
 Wish (1993)
With Red Rodney
The Red Tornado (Muse, 1975)
With Sonny Rollins
 Our Man in Jazz (RCA Victor, 1965)
 There Will Never Be Another You (recorded 1965 released 1978)
With Charlie Rouse
 Bossa Nova Bacchanal (Blue Note, 1965)
With Hilton Ruiz
Piano Man (SteepleChase, 1975)
With Pharoah Sanders
 Rejoice (Theresa, 1981)
With Rob Schneiderman
 Smooth Sailing (Reservoir, 1990)
With John Scofield
 Works for Me (Verve, 2001)
With Shirley Scott
 One for Me (Strata-East, 1974)
With Archie Shepp
 Attica Blues (Impulse!, 1972)
With Sonny Simmons
 Rumasuma (Contemporary, 1969)
With James Spaulding
James Spaulding Plays the Legacy of Duke Ellington (Storyville, 1977)
With Robert Stewart
Judgement (World Stage, 1994 / Red Records, 1997)
The Movement (Exodus, 2002)
With Sonny Stitt
Blues for Duke (Muse, 1975 [1978])
With Idrees Sulieman
 Now Is the Time (SteepleChase, 1976)
With Ira Sullivan 
Peace (Galaxy, 1978)
 Multimedia (Galaxy, 1978 [1982])
With Sun Ra
 Somewhere Else (Rounder, 1988–89)
 Blue Delight (A&M, 1989)
With Cecil Taylor
 Jumpin' Punkins (Candid, 1961)
 New York City R&B (Candid, 1961)
With Lucky Thompson
Goodbye Yesterday (Groove Merchant, 1973)
With the Timeless All Stars
It's Timeless (Timeless, 1982)
Timeless Heart (Timeless, 1983)
Essence (Delos, 1986)
Time for the Timeless All Stars (Early Bird, 1990)
With Bobby Timmons
 Soul Food (Prestige, 1966)
 Got to Get It! (Milestone, 1967)
With Charles Tolliver
 The New Wave in Jazz (Impulse!, 1965)
With Stanley Turrentine
More Than a Mood (MusicMasters, 1992)
With Mal Waldron
 Up Popped the Devil (Enja, 1973)
 One Entrance, Many Exits (Palo Alto, 1982)
With Cedar Walton
 Cedar! (Prestige, 1967)
 Eastern Rebellion (Timeless, 1976) with George Coleman & Sam Jones
 The Pentagon (East Wind, 1976)
 Eastern Rebellion 2 (Timeless, 1977) with Bob Berg & Sam Jones
 First Set (SteepleChase, 1977 [1978])
 Second Set  (SteepleChase, 1977 [1979])
 Third Set  (SteepleChase, 1977 [1982])
 Eastern Rebellion 3 (Timeless, 1980) with Curtis Fuller, Bob Berg & Sam Jones
 The Maestro (Muse, 1981)
 Among Friends (Theresa, 1982 [1989])
 Eastern Rebellion 4 (Timeless, 1984) with Curtis Fuller, Bob Berg, Alfredo "Chocolate" Armenteros & David Williams
 Cedar's Blues (Red, 1985)
 The Trio 1 (Red, 1985)
 The Trio 2 (Red, 1985)
 The Trio 3 (Red, 1985)
 Cedar Walton (Timeless, 1985)
 Bluesville Time (Criss Cross Jazz, 1985)
 Cedar Walton Plays (Delos, 1986)
As Long as There's Music (Muse, 1990 [1993])
Mosaic (Music Masters, 1990 [1992]) as Eastern Rebellion
Simple Pleasure (Music Masters, 1993) as Eastern Rebellion
 Manhattan Afternoon (Criss Cross Jazz, 1992 [1994])
Just One of Those Nights: At the Village Vanguard (Music Masters, 1995) as Eastern Rebellion
With Don Wilkerson
 The Texas Twister (1960)
 Preach Brother! (1962)
With David Williams
 Up Front (Timeless, 1987)
With Jack Wilson
 Easterly Winds (Blue Note, 1967)

References

External links 

 [ Billy Higgins at Allmusic]
 Paean by Tony Gieske

American jazz drummers
Free jazz drummers
Hard bop drummers
African-American drummers
Jazz musicians from California
Musicians from Los Angeles
1936 births
2001 deaths
Grammy Award winners
Timeless Records artists
Red Records artists
Contemporary Records artists
Avant-garde jazz drummers
Deaths from hepatitis
20th-century American drummers
American male drummers
20th-century American male musicians
American male jazz musicians
20th-century African-American musicians